Alexander Alexandrov or Aleksandr Aleksandrov may refer to:

Aleksandr Danilovich Aleksandrov (1912–1999), Russian mathematician and physicist
Aleksandr Pavlovich Aleksandrov (born 1943), Russian cosmonaut
Aleksandr Panayotov Aleksandrov (born 1951), Bulgarian cosmonaut
Alexander Vasilyevich Alexandrov (1883–1946), Russian composer
Aleksandar Aleksandrov (footballer, born 1975), known as Alex, Bulgarian footballer
Aleksandar Aleksandrov (footballer, born April 1986), Bulgarian footballer
Aleksandar Aleksandrov (footballer, born July 1986), Bulgarian footballer
Aleksandar Aleksandrov (footballer, born 1993), Bulgarian footballer
Aleksandar Aleksandrov (rower) (born 1990), Azerbaijani rower
Aleksandar Aleksandrov (boxer) (born 1984), Bulgarian Olympic boxer
Alexander Alexandrov (gymnastics coach) (born 1950), Russian gymnastics coach
Aleksandar Aleksandrov (volleyball) (born 1944), Bulgarian Olympic volleyball player